Alex Miller (born August 20, 1973) is a Republican politician and businesswoman from Florida. She served half of her two-year term in the Florida House of Representatives, representing parts of Sarasota in District 72.

History 
Miller was born in Garden City, New York in 1973. Miller graduated from the University of Rhode Island with a BA in Psychology in 1995. She went on to receive her MBA at Johns Hopkins University's Carey School of Business in 2009. She moved to Florida in 1995. Miller is a Christian.

Business 
Miller is the CEO of Mercedes Medical, a medical and laboratory supply company in Sarasota.

Florida House of Representatives 
Miller defeated Democrat Edward James in the 2016 general election. During her time in office, she sat on the Careers & Competition Subcommittee, Government Accountability Committee, Higher Education Appropriations Subcommittee, Local, Federal & Veterans Affairs Subcommittee, and Tourism & Gaming Control Subcommittee. 
On August 24, 2017, Miller announced her resignation from the Florida House of Representatives which was effective September 1, 2017. She cited not having enough time to raise her two teenage sons and focus on her rapidly growing business as reasons for her resignation. She is succeeded by Democrat Margaret Good.

See also 

 Florida House of Representatives
 Garden City, New York

References

Living people
Women state legislators in Florida
1973 births
Johns Hopkins Carey Business School alumni
University of Rhode Island alumni
Republican Party members of the Florida House of Representatives
21st-century American politicians
21st-century American women politicians